Andrés Montaño may refer to:

Andrés Montaño (wrestler) (born 1990), Ecuadorian Greco-Roman wrestler
Andrés Montaño (footballer) (born 2002), Mexican footballer